Božidar Kljajević is a historian, geographer and ethnologist. He has studied the genealogy of Serb families for four decades.

Life
He was born in Kosanica, near Berane, on January 6, 1953.

Work

Personal life
He lives in Zemun with his wife. He has two sons.

References

1953 births
Living people
20th-century Serbian historians
Serbian geographers
Serbian ethnographers
Serbs of Montenegro
Serbian people of Montenegrin descent
People from Berane
21st-century Serbian historians